Andrew Francis Blowers (born 27 March 1975) is a rugby union player who played for Auckland Blues, Northampton Saints and Bristol. He played for the New Zealand national rugby union team between 1996 and 1999 in which he had played 11 tests and 7 games. His position is flanker.

Bristol announced the signing of the former All Black to boost their push for Heineken Cup qualification following the loss of Dan Ward-Smith to injury.

International career 
Blowers was born in Auckland, New Zealand. As a result of his Samoan heritage, he started his international career for the Samoa national rugby union team.
Blowers' scored on his All Blacks debut on Tuesday, 6 August 1996, versus Boland Invitation XV at Worcester. Four days later he received his first international cap versus South Africa at Cape Town.

After 18 All Black matches he played his final game against Italy on Thursday, 14 October 1999. Of his 11 competitive tests the All Blacks won 10, their only loss coming at the hands of Australia.

Blowers is no longer eligible to play for All Blacks because he no longer plays in New Zealand.

References

External links
Andrew Blowers stats

1975 births
Living people
New Zealand sportspeople of Samoan descent
Rugby union players from Auckland
Northampton Saints players
Bristol Bears players
New Zealand rugby union players
Blues (Super Rugby) players
New Zealand international rugby union players
People educated at Mount Albert Grammar School
Rugby union flankers
Melbourne Rebels coaches